José Agustín Ortiz Pinchetti (born 13 May 1937) is a Mexican politician affiliated with the Party of the Democratic Revolution. As of 2014 he served as Deputy of the LIX Legislature of the Mexican Congress as a plurinominal representative.

References

1937 births
Living people
Politicians from Mexico City
Members of the Chamber of Deputies (Mexico)
Party of the Democratic Revolution politicians
Escuela Libre de Derecho alumni
21st-century Mexican politicians
Deputies of the LIX Legislature of Mexico